The 1999 Milton Keynes Council election took place on 6 May 1999 to elect members of Milton Keynes Unitary Council in Buckinghamshire, England. One third of the council was up for election and the Labour party stayed in overall control of the council.

After the election, the composition of the council was
Labour 27
Liberal Democrat 19
Conservative 4
Independent 1

Background
In the February before the election Milton Keynes held a referendum on the level of council tax increase there would be and the corresponding changes in services that would be made. Voters on a 45% turnout chose the middle option of a 9.8% increase, which meant that council tax levels were not a major issue in the election campaign.

Election result
The results saw Labour hold onto a majority on the council after the other parties failed to make the 2 gains needed to deprive Labour of control. Overall turnout in the election was 29.1%.

Ward results

References

1999 English local elections
1999
1990s in Buckinghamshire